Hacallı (also, Gadzhaly and Gadzhally) is a village in the Barda Rayon of Azerbaijan.

References

Populated places in Barda District